is a Japanese-French professional mixed martial artist and kickboxer who most recently competed in Bellator's Middleweight division. A professional MMA competitor since 2013, he has also competed for Rizin.

Background
Born and raised in Paris, Kato's father was a Japanese judoka who moved to Paris to pursue a career teaching the martial art, and become one of the top instructors in the country. However, he died when Kato was only a few years old. Kato's mother is French. Growing up, Kato pursued judo but favored the striking techniques of traditional Japanese martial arts such as karate. Kato was also a highly-talented handball player; he began competing in junior high and moved to Japan at the age of 18 where he competed for the national team and attended college. He later returned to his martial arts roots at the age of 23, joining the Kudo Federation of Japan where he competed and won five consecutive national tournaments. After winning his fifth title, Kato was offered a contract by the Japanese MMA promotion HEAT.

Mixed martial arts career

Early career
Kato made his professional debut in March 2013. In the first two years of his career, Kato competed exclusively for the Japan-based promotion, Heat. He compiled a 4–1 record, which included a first-round TKO of Yuki Niimura to win the vacant Heat Middleweight Championship.

Bellator MMA
Kato faced Joe Schilling in his promotional and United States debut at Bellator 139 on June 26, 2015. Despite being a sizable underdog, Kato won the bout in highlight-reel fashion, knocking out the seasoned kickboxer with a superman punch early in the second round.

In August 2015, Kato signed an exclusive, multi-fight contract with the promotion.

Kato faced another experienced kickboxer, Melvin Manhoef, at Bellator 146 on November 20, 2015 in the main event. Kato lost the fight via knockout due to a left hook from Manhoef in the first round.

Kato returned to Bellator in a mixed martial arts bout against A.J. Matthews on October 21, 2016 at Bellator 162.  He won the fight via TKO in the first round.

Kato faced Ralek Gracie at Bellator 170 on January 21, 2017. He won the fight via unanimous decision.

Kato faced Chidi Njokuani at Bellator 189 on December 1, 2017. He lost the fight by unanimous decision. Kato was subsequently released from the promotion.

Kickboxing

Bellator Kickboxing
On June 24, 2016, Kato made his professional kickboxing debut for Bellator Kickboxing. He faced Joe Schilling in a rematch at Bellator Kicking 2. Despite Schilling being the more experienced kickboxer, Kato again won the fight by knockout due to a spinning back fist in the second round.

K-1
Kato was scheduled to face Makoto Uehara for his K-1 debut. He beat Uehara by decision, after an extra round was fought.

In his second fight with K-1, Kato was scheduled to fight RUI. Kato won the fight by a first round KO.

Kato challenged for the K-1 Cruiserweight title, held at the time by Sina Karimian, during K-1 K'Festa 2. He lost the fight by a unanimous decision.

After his failed title shot, Kato was scheduled to fight K-Jee in December 2019. He won the fight by a second round KO.

The two of them fought a rematch during Krush 112, for the Krush Cruiserweight title. K-Jee won the fight in the first round, by a body shot KO.

For his sixth fight with K-1, Kato was scheduled to fight Mahmoud Sattari at K-1: K’Festa 4. He lost the fight by a second-round knockout, suffering a broken nose in the process.

Kato faced Ryo Aitaka at K-1: K'Festa 5 on April 3, 2022, in the reserve bout of the 2022 K-1 openweight tournament. He won the fight by a third-round knockout. As Satoshi Ishii later withdrew from the tournament due to injury, he stepped in as the replacement to face Seiya Tanigawa in the tournament semifinals. He lost the semifinal bout by a first-round knockout.

Kato faced Akira Junior at K-1 World GP 2022 in Osaka on December 3, 2022. Despite scoring a knockdown in the first round, he lost the fight by a second-round knockout.

Championships and accomplishments

Kickboxing
HEAT
Heat Middleweight Championship (One time)

Awards
 Combat Press 2016 Upset of the Year (vs. Joe Schilling)

Mixed martial arts
MMA Junkie
June 2015 Knockout of the Month vs. Joe Schilling on June 26

Mixed martial arts record

|-
|Loss
|align=center|8–3
|Chidi Njokuani
|Decision (unanimous)
|Bellator 189
|
|align=center| 3
|align=center| 5:00
|Thackerville, Oklahoma, United States
|
|-
|Win
|align=center|8–2
|Ralek Gracie
|Decision (unanimous)
|Bellator 170
|
|align=center|3
|align=center|5:00
|Inglewood, California, United States
|
|-
|Win
|align=center|7–2
|A.J. Matthews
|TKO (punches)
|Bellator 162
|
|align=center|1
|align=center|4:58
|Memphis, Tennessee, United States
|
|-
|Win
|align=center|6–2
|Yuta Watanabe
|TKO (punches)
|Rizin Fighting Federation 1
|
|align=center|1
|align=center|1:05
|Nagoya, Japan
|
|-
|Loss
|align=center|5–2
|Melvin Manhoef
|KO (punch)
|Bellator 146
|
|align=center|1
|align=center|3:43
|Thackerville, Oklahoma, United States
|
|-
|Win
|align=center|5–1
|Joe Schilling
|KO (superman punch)
|Bellator 139
|
|align=center|2
|align=center|0:34
|Mulvane, Kansas, United States
|
|-
|Loss
|align=center|4–1
|Henrique Shigemoto
|TKO (punches)
|Heat 35
|
|align=center|1
|align=center|4:16
|Nagoya, Aichi, Japan
|
|-
|Win
|align=center|4–0
|Yuki Niimura
|TKO (punches)
|Heat 31
|
|align=center|1
|align=center|0:53
|Nagoya, Aichi, Japan
|
|-
|Win
|align=center|3–0
|Yusuke Sakashita
|TKO (head kick and punches)
|Heat 30
|
|align=center|2
|align=center|0:28
|Kobe, Hyogo, Japan
|
|-
|Win
|align=center|2–0
|Yuta Nakamura
|TKO (punches)
|Heat 28
|
|align=center|1
|align=center|2:14
|Nagoya, Aichi, Japan
|
|-
|Win
|align=center|1–0
|Tsukasa Kawaoka
|TKO (punches)
|Heat 26
|
|align=center|1
|align=center|1:29
|Nagoya, Aichi, Japan
|

Kickboxing record

|- style="background:#fbb;"
| 2022-12-03 || Loss ||align=left| Akira Junior ||  K-1 World GP 2022 in Osaka || Osaka, Japan || TKO (Referee stoppage) || 2 || 1:40 || 5-5
|- style="background:#fbb;"
| 2022-04-03 || Loss ||align=left| Seiya Tanigawa || K-1: K'Festa 5, Tournament Semifinals || Tokyo, Japan || KO (Head kick) || 1 || 2:20 || 5-4
|- style="background:#cfc;"
| 2022-04-03 || Win ||align=left| Ryo Aitaka || K-1: K'Festa 5, Tournament Reserve Bout || Tokyo, Japan || KO (Left hook) || 3 || 1:05 || 5-3
|-  style="background:#fbb;"
| 2021-03-21|| Loss || align=left| Mahmoud Sattari || K-1: K’Festa 4 || Tokyo, Japan || KO (Knee to the head)  || 2 || 0:26 || 4-3
|-  bgcolor="#fbb"
| 2020-03-28 || Loss|| align=left| K-Jee || Krush 112 || Nagoya, Japan || KO (Left Hook to the Body) || 1 || 2:10|| 4-2
|-
! style=background:white colspan=9 |
|-  bgcolor="#CCFFCC"
| 2019-12-28 || Win || align=left| K-Jee || K-1 World GP 2019 Japan: ～Women's Flyweight Championship Tournament～ || Nagoya, Japan || KO (Left Cross) || 2 || 1:17|| 4-1
|-  bgcolor="#fbb"
| 2019-03-10 || Loss || align=left| Sina Karimian || K-1 World GP 2019: K’FESTA 2 || Saitama, Japan || Decision (Unanimous) || 3 || 3:00|| 3-1
|-
! style=background:white colspan=9 |
|-  bgcolor="#CCFFCC"
| 2018-11-03 || Win || align=left| RUI || K-1 World GP 2018: 3rd Super Lightweight Championship Tournament || Saitama, Japan || KO (Left Overhand) || 1 || 1:59|| 3-0
|-  bgcolor="#CCFFCC"
| 2018-06-17 || Win || align=left| Makoto Uehara|| K-1 World GP 2018: 2nd Featherweight Championship Tournament || Saitama, Japan || Extra Round Decision (Split) || 4 || 3:00|| 2-0
|-
|-  bgcolor="#CCFFCC"
| 2016-06-24 || Win ||align=left| Joe Schilling || Bellator Kickboxing 2: St. Louis || St. Louis, Missouri, USA || KO (spinning back fist)|| 2 || 2:59 || 1–0
|-
|-
| colspan=9 | Legend:

See also
 List of current Bellator fighters

References

Living people
1982 births
Japanese male mixed martial artists
Middleweight mixed martial artists
Japanese male kickboxers
Japanese male karateka
Mixed martial artists utilizing kūdō
Mixed martial artists utilizing Kyokushin kaikan
Japanese people of French descent